Sabine Lisicki was the defending champion but was defeated in the second round by Urszula Radwańska.

Melanie Oudin won her maiden and only WTA tour title, defeating Jelena Janković in the final 6–4, 6–2.

Seeds

Draw

Finals

Top half

Section one

Section two

Bottom half

Section three

Section four

Qualifying

Seeds
Zheng and Dushevina would have made it to the main draw, however, they registered late. Zheng would have been 7th seed.

Qualifiers

Lucky loser

  Sesil Karatantcheva
  Alla Kudryavtseva

Draw

First qualifier

Second qualifier

Third qualifier

Fourth qualifier

Fifth qualifier

Sixth qualifier

Seventh qualifier

Eighth qualifier

References
 Main Draw
 Qualifying Draw

Aegon Classic - Singles
Singles